"That Day" is a song by Australian singer-songwriter Natalie Imbruglia, released as the first single from her second album, White Lilies Island (2001). In Australia, the song reached number 10, while in the United Kingdom, it peaked at number 11. The song also charted well in Italy, peaking at number 14, and in Sweden, where it reached number 34. RCA Records chose not to release "That Day" in the United States, where "Wrong Impression" served as the album's lead single instead.

Track listings
Australian and Japanese CD single
 "That Day" – 4:04
 "Shikaiya (For Billy)" – 3:41
 "Just Another Day" – 4:22

UK CD single
 "That Day" – 4:43
 "Shikaiya (For Billy)" – 3:40
 "Just Another Day" – 4:24
 "That Day" (enhanced video)

UK cassette single and European CD single
 "That Day" – 4:43
 "Shikaiya (For Billy)" – 3:40

Credits and personnel
Credits are lifted from the White Lilies Island album booklet.

Studios
 Drums recorded at Westside (London, England)
 Mixed at Whitfield Street Studio C (London, England)
 Mastered at 360 Mastering (London, England)

Personnel

 Natalie Imbruglia – writing
 Patrick Leonard – writing
 Viveen Wray – backing vocals
 Neil Taylor – guitars
 Guy Pratt – bass
 Ian Stanley – keyboards, production, mixing, engineering
 Maz – drums
 Marc Fox – percussion
 John Dunne – programming
 Gary Langan – recording (drums)
 Dave Bascombe – mixing
 Andrew Nicholls – mixing assistance
 Jo Buckley – assistant engineering
 Dick Beetham – mastering

Charts

Release history

References

2001 singles
2001 songs
Bertelsmann Music Group singles
Natalie Imbruglia songs
RCA Records singles
Songs written by Natalie Imbruglia
Songs written by Patrick Leonard